Taft is a census-designated place and an unincorporated area in Orange County, Florida, United States. The population was 2,205 at the 2010 census. It is part of the Orlando–Kissimmee Metropolitan Statistical Area.

Geography
Taft is located at  (28.428983, -81.367788).

According to the United States Census Bureau, the CDP has a total area of 2.7 km (1.0 mi2), of which 2.6 km (1.0 mi2) is land and 0.1 km (0.04 mi2) (2.88%) is water.

Demographics

As of the census of 2000, there were 1,938 people, 678 households, and 463 families residing in the CDP.  The population density was 733.6/km (1,907.3/mi2).  There were 729 housing units at an average density of 275.9/km (717.5/mi2).  The racial makeup of the CDP was 84.88% White, 6.66% African American, 1.08% Native American, 1.70% Asian, 0.36% Pacific Islander, 4.70% from other races, and 0.62% from two or more races. Hispanic or Latino of any race were 15.38% of the population.

There were 678 households, out of which 29.4% had children under the age of 18 living with them, 42.6% were married couples living together, 17.8% had a female householder with no husband present, and 31.6% were non-families. 19.2% of all households were made up of individuals, and 4.7% had someone living alone who was 65 years of age or older.  The average household size was 2.86 and the average family size was 3.20.

In the CDP, the population was spread out, with 25.6% under the age of 18, 8.8% from 18 to 24, 32.9% from 25 to 44, 23.6% from 45 to 64, and 9.1% who were 65 years of age or older.  The median age was 34 years. For every 100 females, there were 113.4 males.  For every 100 females age 18 and over, there were 116.0 males.

The median income for a household in the CDP was $32,500, and the median income for a family was $32,250. Males had a median income of $25,438 versus $25,893 for females. The per capita income for the CDP was $12,331.  About 14.8% of families and 14.3% of the population were below the poverty line, including 16.1% of those under age 18 and 8.4% of those age 65 or over.

References

External links
 Prosper Colony Osceola County, FL Kissimmee Valley Gazette, September 3, 1909, pg. 1, via Genealogy Club of Osceola County

Unincorporated communities in Orange County, Florida
Census-designated places in Orange County, Florida
Greater Orlando
Census-designated places in Florida
Unincorporated communities in Florida
Former municipalities in Florida